Pachytullbergiidae is a family of springtails in the order Poduromorpha. There are at least two genera and four described species in Pachytullbergiidae.

Genera
These two genera belong to the family Pachytullbergiidae:
 Pachytullbergia Bonet, 1947
 Sensiphorura Rusek, 1976

References

Further reading

 

Poduromorpha
Arthropod families